The 1987 Oregon State Beavers football team represented Oregon State University in the Pacific-10 Conference (Pac-10) during the 1987 NCAA Division I-A football season. In their third season under head coach Dave Kragthorpe, the Beavers compiled a 2–9 record (0–7 against Pac-10 opponents), finished in last place in the Pac-10, and were outscored by their opponents, 433 to 189.  The team played its home games at Parker Stadium in Corvallis, Oregon.

Schedule

Roster
Robb Thomas (offense)
Mike Dupree.  (defense) /dnp

References

Oregon State
Oregon State Beavers football seasons
Oregon State Beavers football